Ezhantsy (Eceen) is a rural locality (a selo), the only inhabited locality, and the administrative center of Ezhansky National Rural Okrug in Ust-Maysky District of the Sakha Republic, Russia, located  from Ust-Maya, the administrative center of the district. Its population as of the 2010 Census was 360, down from 536 recorded during the 2002 Census.

References

Notes

Sources
Official website of the Sakha Republic. Registry of the Administrative-Territorial Divisions of the Sakha Republic. Ust-Maysky District. 

Rural localities in Ust-Maysky District